San Bassano (locally ) is a comune (municipality) in the Province of Cremona in the Italian region Lombardy, located about  southeast of Milan and about  northwest of Cremona.

San Bassano borders the following municipalities: Cappella Cantone, Castelleone, Formigara, Gombito, Pizzighettone.

References

External links
 Official website

Cities and towns in Lombardy